"Nikes" is a song recorded by American singer Frank Ocean. It was released on August 20, 2016, as the lead single from his second studio album, Blonde (2016), accompanied by a music video directed by Tyrone Lebon, exclusive to Apple Music. It is Ocean's first single since "Super Rich Kids", which was released in 2013. Ocean wrote the song, producing it alongside Malay Ho and Om'Mas Keith. Former Dirty Projectors vocalist Amber Coffman contributed additional vocals.

The single was also used in the 2020 HBO drama We Are Who We Are, as the miniseries takes place in 2016.

Critical reception
Billboard ranked "Nikes" at number 28 on their "100 Best Pop Songs of 2016" list: “As the first song on the most highly-anticipated album since D'Angelo re-emerged with Black Messiah, "Nikes" was always going to be heavily scrutinized—but as a re-introduction, it worked brilliantly. Its first three minutes are delivered in a pitched-up approximation of a child's voice, picking apart the hidden motives behind the wants and desires of his subject with a sweetly-concealed irony, as a musical dreamscape gently glides underneath. It serves almost as a lullaby of sorts—which makes the transition to his "real" voice, arriving suddenly for the second verse, that much more effective. "Nikes" proved that Frank Ocean was back, and with a whole new set of emotions to get off his chest.”

Pitchfork listed "Nikes" on their ranking of the 100 best songs of 2016 at number 25.

Music video

The music video was released exclusively on Apple Music on August 20, 2016. While talking about the video in an interview with The Fader, director Tyrone Lebon said; "The visuals came immediately when I first heard the song - they all follow from the music and Frank’s lyrics." The video features a cameo appearance from American rapper ASAP Rocky holding a picture of the late ASAP Yams. It also pays tribute to Pimp C and Trayvon Martin. NPR named it as one of the best music videos of 2016.

Personnel
 Frank Ocean – production, arrangement, additional programming
 Malay Ho – production, arrangement, Mellotron, drum programming
 Om'Mas Keith – production, arrangement, drum programming
 Amber Coffman – additional vocals

Charts

Certifications

Release history

References

2016 singles
2016 songs
Frank Ocean songs
Songs written by Frank Ocean
Avant-pop songs